Euchromius bleszynskiellus is a species of moth in the family Crambidae. It is found in Greece, Romania and Russia.

References

Moths described in 1964
Crambinae
Moths of Europe